Lichuan is a county-level city of the Enshi Tujia and Miao Autonomous Prefecture, in southwestern Hubei province, People's Republic of China, located  west of Enshi City, the prefecture seat. It borders Chongqing Municipality to the southwest, west, and north. It has approximately 870,000 inhabitants.

Nature
Lichuan is believed to be the location of most (if not all) of the naturally growing Metasequoia glyptostroboides trees in existence. 
The genus Metasequoia, related to the giant redwoods of North America, was first described as a fossil from the Mesozoic Era  in 1941. But in 1943 a small stand of an unidentified tree was discovered in Modaoxi, presently known as Moudao Town, in Lichuan County, by Zhan Wang. After the end of the World War II, this tree species was officially  described as the only living species of Metasequoia, and given the scientific name Metasequoia glyptostroboides. In 1948 the Arnold Arboretum of Harvard University sent an expedition to Lichuan to collect seeds and, soon after, seedling trees were distributed to various universities and arboreta worldwide for growth trials.

Presently, a number of natural  Metasequoia populations exist in the hills and wetlands of Lichuan. Most of these groups  are small, with fewer than 30 trees each; however, the largest of them, in Xiaohe Valley, is estimated to consist of around 5,400 trees. Outside of Lichuan, a few trees are also said to exist in the Hunan Province.

The Tenglong Cave is located within a few miles from Lichuan.

Administrative divisions 
There are two subdistricts, seven towns, and five townships under the city's administration:

Subdistricts
Two subdistricts:
Duting Subdistrict
Dongcheng Subdistrict

Towns
Seven towns:
Moudao
Baiyangba
Wangying
Jiannan
Zhonglu
Tuanbao
Maoba (before 2013 was Maoba Township)

Townships
Five townships:
Liangwu Township
Yuanbao Township
Nanping Township
Wendou Township
Shaxi Township

Climate

Transport 
China National Highway 318 runs through Lichuan on its way from Enshi to Wanzhou, Chongqing. G50 Shanghai–Chongqing Expressway also passes to the south of the city centre.

Until the opening of the Yiwan Railway in 2010, there were no railways in Lichuan (or anywhere in Enshi Prefecture). Now Lichuan Station has regular service to Chengdu, Wuhan, and points beyond. In the future, Lichuan will become a junction where the future Yuli Railway (the line from Lichuan toward Chongqing) will join the Yiwan Railway mainline (from Yichang via Lichuan to Wanzhou, with further connections to Chengdu).

Proposals have also been made for the construction of a tourist scenic railway between Lichuan Railway Station and the region's popular tourist attractions, the Tenglong Cave and the Enshi Grand Canyon Scenic Area.

References

External links

Cities in Hubei
County-level divisions of Hubei
Enshi Tujia and Miao Autonomous Prefecture